BVR may refer to:
Beyond-visual-range missile an air-to-air missile
Biliverdin reductase,  an enzyme 
Buffalo Volunteer Rifles, an infantry regiment of the South African Army
Bundesverband der Deutschen Volksbanken und Raiffeisenbanken (Federal Association of German 'Volksbanken und Raiffeisenbanken' Co-operative Banks)
Bure Valley Railway, a narrow-gauge heritage railway in Norfolk, England